Night Demon is an American heavy metal band from Ventura, California. Performing as a power trio, the band is among several bands participating in the resurgence of traditional, old-school heavy metal in the 2010s. Night Demon has released two studio albums on independent record labels  plus a live concert album and regularly performs at heavy metal festivals worldwide.

History

Beginnings and Night Demon EP (2011–2014) 

Night Demon was formed by vocalist/bassist Jarvis Leatherby and guitarist Brent Woodward in May 2011.

The Night Demon EP was released on June 18, 2013, in 7" vinyl format (500 copies) via Reinig Records.  Two months later, Shadow Kingdom Records issued a CD edition of the EP. The Night Demon EP was well received by the underground heavy metal press; According to a Blabbermouth.net review, the tracks would appeal to existing fans of vintage headbanger music and also attract some new listeners to the genre.

In September 2013, Night Demon retained Pennsylvania transplant Dusty Squires (formerly of the band New Liberty) as drummer. A month later, the band performed three shows in Santa Ana, Los Angeles and Las Vegas with NWOBHM bands Raven and Diamond Head.  In April 2014, Night Demon made their first festival appearance at the Ragnarokkr Metal Apocalypse in Chicago, Illinois.  On April 23, 2014, the band embarked on a six-week, 31-show European tour, starting in Cologne, Germany and including appearances at Keep It True Festival (Germany), Pounding Metal Festival (Spain), and Muskelrock Festival (Sweden).

Night Demon was the guest band on Raven's seven-week "ExtermiNation America Tour 2014" in October and November 2014.  During this time, the band's live shows included nightly appearances by the band's mascot "Rocky", the hooded skeletal goblet-wielding figure from the cover of the Night Demon EP; since then Rocky's appearance onstage during "The Chalice" has become a regular event during Night Demon performances.

Curse of the Damned (2015–2016) 

Night Demon's full-length debut album, Curse of the Damned, was released in January 2015 on SPV in Europe and on Century Media Records in the rest of the world. The album garnered many favorable reviews, and was voted the #1 album of 2015 by listeners of the WJCU Metal on Metal radio show.

Guitarist Brent Woodward parted ways with Night Demon in January 2016.  His replacement, Armand John Anthony, had served as a studio engineer on both the Curse of the Damned album and the debut EP.  He had previously played with Night Demon drummer Dusty Squires in New Liberty and he had played drums for Night Demon as a last-minute fill-in for a show at the Old Towne Pub in Pasadena, California in 2013.

The new Night Demon lineup continued touring internationally in support of Curse of the Damned. They performed about 100 shows in 2016 and early 2017, including "Final Curse" tours of the United States with Utah band Visigoth. concerts in Europe in which they performed Curse of the Damned in its entirety, a slot on the Carcass / Crowbar / Ghoul tour of the US in summer 2016, appearances at Germany's Bang Your Head!!! Festival, a second appearance at their hometown Frost & Fire Festival, and a 19-show South American tour.

Darkness Remains (2017–2018) 

Night Demon's second album, Darkness Remains, was released in April 2017 on SPV in Europe and on Century Media Records in the rest of the world. The album was preceded by the singles "Welcome to the Night" (with an accompanying music video) and "Hallowed Ground."   A 7" vinyl single for "Black Widow" was also issued, backed with a cover version of Black Sabbath's "Turn Up the Night". Darkness Remains was released to positive reviews from the worldwide heavy metal press, including monthly soundcheck rankings of #1 in Deaf Forever magazine and #3 in Hard Rock. The German Metal Hammer magazine praised Darkness Remains and recommended the album to fans of early music by Iron Maiden, Jaguar, and Tygers of Pan Tang.

Night Demon played more than 100 shows around the world in 2017 in support of Darkness Remains.  Highlights included a spring US tour supporting Anvil, a spring European tour dubbed "Darkness Over Europe", a November tour of the UK and Ireland (Darkness over U.K.&Ireland), and appearances at festivals in Europe and the US, including Ozzfest (California), Rock Hard Festival (Germany), Summer Breeze Open Air (Germany), Party San (Germany), Keep It True (Germany), Very 'Eavy (Netherlands), Pounding Metal (Spain), Up the Hammers (Greece), Muskelrock (Sweden), Headbangers Open Air (Germany), Chaos Descends (Germany), Defenders of the Old (New York), Days of Darkness (Maryland),  and Frost & Fire (California).  Night Demon closed out the year with a headlining appearance at the Cleveland Metal Holiday Food Drive in Cleveland, Ohio in December. The show was recorded in front of a large crowd at The Beachland Ballroom and was released as a triple-live album, Live Darkness, in August 2018 via Century Media Records/Shadow Kingdom Records in the US, and SPV in Europe.

In September 2017, the German Metal Hammer magazine presented Night Demon with an award for best "Up & Coming" band. The Metal Hammer awards show received substantial international media coverage. Darkness Remains was named album of the year in magazines such as Deaf Forever and Rocks!, and Night Demon again earned the top spot in the WJCU Metal on Metal Listeners Poll for 2017.

In 2018, Night Demon toured Europe for five weeks in January and February 2018 as part of Accept's "The Rise of Chaos" tour. That summer they went on the European festival circuit, including return engagements at the Rock Hard Festival and the Bang Your Head!!! Festival in Germany, and Muskelrock in Sweden, as well as their debut appearance at the Wacken Open Air Festival, the largest heavy metal festival in the world.

Live Darkness (2018–2020) 

Following the release of the Live Darkness album in summer 2018, Night Demon embarked on extensive tours of the United States and Europe, then played a series of one-off shows in both North America and Europe. On November 30, 2018, the band performed at the Decibel Magazine festival pre-party at the legendary Troubadour nightclub in West Hollywood, California supporting Armored Saint.  On December 21, 2018, Night Demon played the "Another Death Angel Xmas" show with Bay Area thrash veterans Death Angel at the famed Slim's venue in San Francisco, California.

On February 2–3, 2019, Night Demon played a pair of shows aboard the Independence of the Seas cruise ship as part of the 70000 Tons of Metal Festival traveling between Ft. Lauderdale and Haiti. On March 2, 2019, the band headlined the Hell Over Hammaburg festival at the Markthalle Hamburg in the city of Hamburg, Germany. At this special show, former Scorpions guitarist Uli Jon Roth joined Night Demon on stage for an encore consisting of "In Trance" and "Top of the Bill" from the Scorpions' 1975 In Trance album. In November and December 2019, Night Demon conducted a five-week tour of Europe as direct support for Arizona thrash metal band Sacred Reich.

In spring 2020, Night Demon released their first new music in three years. On April 3, 2020, the band released a new single called "Empires Fall", featuring a cover of "Fast Bikes" by obscure NWOBHM band Le Griffe as the B-side. On May 8, 2020, Night Demon released a second single entitled "Kill the Pain", with the B-side being a cover of Cirith Ungol song "100 mph". During the spring and summer of 2020, three more strictly limited 7" singles followed: "Are You Out There" (b/w Thin Lizzy cover "The Sun Goes Down") released on June 5, 2020; "Vysteria" (b/w Iron Maiden cover "Wasted Years") released on July 3, 2020; and "In Trance" (Scorpions cover b/w "Top of the Bill" both recorded live with Uli Jon Roth) released on August 7, 2020.

Year of the Demon (2022) 

All five of the 2020 7" singles sold out almost instantly. Many diehard fans were unable to obtain physical copies. And none of the B-sides of these singles were ever released on digital/streaming platforms. To bring these songs to a wider audience, Night Demon will release a special compilation album entitled Year of the Demon via Century Media Records worldwide on March 25, 2022, in various physical and digital formats. Year of the Demon collects all 10 songs from the 2020 standalone singles in a comprehensive repository, and adds stunning new artwork to the package. Following the release of this album, Night Demon is touring extensively worldwide for the remainder of 2022. Plans call for a brand-new studio album to see the light of day in early 2023.

Band members 
Current
 Jarvis Leatherby – lead vocals, bass (2011–present)
 Dusty Squires – drums, backing vocals (2013–present)
 Armand John Anthony – guitars, backing vocals (2016–present)

Former
 Brent Woodward – guitars (2011–2016)
 Patrick Bailey – drums (2011–2012)
 John Crerar – drums (2012–2013)

Discography 
 Night Demon EP (Shadow Kingdom Records) – 2013, re-released in various formats on a number of labels in 2014–2018
 Curse of the Damned (Century Media/US, Steamhammer/Europe) – January 2015
 Darkness Remains (Century Media/US, Steamhammer/Europe) – April 2017
 Live Darkness (Century Media and Shadow Kingdom/US, Steamhammer/Europe) – August 2018
 Year of the Demon (Century Media) - March 2022

Singles
 "Empires Fall" (Century Media) – 2020
 "Kill the Pain" (Century Media) – 2020
 "Are You Out There" (Century Media) - 2020
 "Vysteria" (Century Media) - 2020
 "In Trance" (Century Media) - 2020
 "The Last Day" (Decibel Flexi Series) - 2022

References

External links

Heavy metal musical groups from California
Musical groups established in 2011
Musical groups from Ventura County, California
2011 establishments in California